Nauryz kozhe is a Kazakh/Kyrgyz drink of milk, horse meat, salt, kashk and grains.

On Nauryz (Nooruz), the Kazakh and the Kyrgyz start the new year with this drink for good luck because it is considered a symbol of wealth and richness in the coming year. It consists of seven food elements, such as milk, meat, oil, millet, rice, raisins, corn (the recipe can vary).

See also
Kazakh cuisine
Kyrgyz cuisine
Culture of Kazakhstan
Culture of Kyrgyzstan
Sabzi polo

References

Milk dishes
Kazakh drinks
Kyrgyz cuisine
New Year foods